Carlos Peña Romulo Sr.  (January 14, 1898 – December 15, 1985) was a Filipino diplomat, statesman, soldier, journalist and author. He was a reporter at the age of 16, a newspaper editor by 20, and a publisher at 32. He was a co-founder of the Boy Scouts of the Philippines, a general in the US Army and the Philippine Army, university president, and president of the United Nations General Assembly.

He has been named as one of the Philippines's national artists in literature, and was the recipient of many other honors and honorary degrees.

Early career

Carlos Romulo was born in Camiling, Tarlac and studied at the Camiling Central Elementary School during his basic education.

Romulo became a professor of English at the University of the Philippines in 1923. Simultaneously, Romulo served as the secretary to the president of the Senate of the Philippines, Manuel Quezon.

During the 1930s, Romulo became the publisher and editor of The Philippines Herald, and one of his reporters was Yay Panlilio. On October 31, 1936, the Boy Scouts of the Philippines (BSP) was given a legislative charter under Commonwealth Act No. 111. Romulo served as one of the vice presidents of the organization.

At the start of World War II, Romulo, a major, served as an aide to General Douglas MacArthur. He was one of the last men evacuated from the Philippines before the surrender of US Forces to the invading Japanese, as illness had prevented him from departing with MacArthur, finally leaving from Del Monte Airfield on Mindanao on April 25. Active in propaganda efforts, particularly through the lecture circuit, after reaching the United States, he became a member of President Quezon's War Cabinet, being appointed Secretary of Information in 1943. He reached the rank of general by the end of the war.

Diplomatic career
Romulo served eight Philippine presidents, from Manuel L. Quezon to Ferdinand Marcos, as the secretary of foreign affairs of the Philippines and as the country's representative to the United States and to the United Nations (UN). He also served as the resident commissioner to the U.S. House of Representatives during the Commonwealth era. In addition, he served also as the secretary of education in President Diosdado P. Macapagal's and President Ferdinand E. Marcos's cabinet through 1962 to 1968.

Resident commissioner
Romulo served as resident commissioner of the Philippines to the United States Congress from 1944 to 1946. This was the title of the non-voting delegate to the US House of Representatives for lands taken in the Spanish–American War, and as such, he is the only member of the US Congress to end his tenure via a legal secession from the union.

United Nations
In his career in the UN, Romulo was a strong advocate of human rights, freedom, and decolonization. In 1948, at the third UN General Assembly in Paris, France, he strongly disagreed with a proposal made by the Soviet delegation headed by Andrei Vishinsky, who challenged his credentials by insulting him with this quote: "You are just a little man from a little country." In return, Romulo replied, "It is the duty of the little Davids of this world to fling the pebbles of truth in the eyes of the blustering Goliaths and force them to behave!", leaving Vishinsky with nothing left to do but sit down.

Palestine partition plan
In the days preceding the UN General Assembly vote on the Partition Plan for Palestine in 1947, Romulo stated "We hold that the issue is primarily moral. The issue is whether the United Nations should accept responsibility for the enforcement of a policy which is clearly repugnant to the valid nationalist aspirations of the people of Palestine. The Philippines Government holds that the United Nations ought not to accept such responsibility." Thus, he clearly intended to oppose the partition plan, or at most abstain in the vote. However, pressure on the Philippines government from Washington led to Romulo being recalled, and was replaced by a Philippines representative who voted in favor of the partition plan.

President of the UN General Assembly
Romulo served as the president of the fourth session of UN General Assembly from 1949 to 1950—the first Asian to hold the position—and served as president of the UN Security Council four times, twice in 1957, 1980 and 1981. He had served with General MacArthur in the Pacific, and became the first non-American to win the Pulitzer Prize in Correspondence in 1942. The Pulitzer Prize website states that Carlos P. Romulo was awarded "for his observations and forecasts of Far Eastern developments during a tour of the trouble centers from Hong Kong to Batavia".

Campaign for secretary-general

Romulo ran for the office of UN secretary-general in the 1953 selection. He fell two votes short of the required seven-vote majority in the Security Council, finishing second to Lester B. Pearson of Canada. His ambitions were further dashed by negative votes from France and the Soviet Union, both of whom were permanent members with veto power. The Security Council eventually settled on a dark horse candidate and selected Dag Hammarskjöld to be UN secretary-general.

Ambassador to the United States
From January 1952 to May 1953, Romulo became only the second former member of the Congress to become the ambassador to the United States from a foreign country, following Joaquín M. Elizalde, who had been his immediate predecessor in both posts. He later served as ambassador again from September 1955 to February 1962.

Return to the Philippines

Philippine presidential aspiration
Romulo returned to the Philippines and was a candidate for the nomination as the presidential candidate for the Liberal Party, but lost at the party convention to the incumbent president, Elpidio Quirino. Quirino had agreed to a secret ballot at the convention, but after the convention opened, he demanded an open roll-call voting, leaving the delegates no choice but to support Quirino, the candidate of the party machine. Feeling betrayed, Romulo left the Liberal Party and became national campaign manager of Ramon Magsaysay, the candidate of the opposing Nacionalista Party, who won the election in 1953.

Minister of Foreign Affairs
Romulo served as the Philippines' secretary (minister from 1973 to 1984) of foreign affairs under President Elpidio Quirino from 1950 to 1952, under President Diosdado Macapagal from 1963 to 1964, and under President Ferdinand Marcos from 1968 to 1984. In April 1955, he led the Philippines' delegation to the Asian-African Conference at Bandung, Indonesia.

Resignation from the Marcos cabinet
Romulo supported President Ferdinand Marcos through most of his presidency. However, he resigned in 1983, soon after the assassination of Benigno Aquino, citing poor health. Gregorio Brillantes interviewed Romulo in 1984, and Romulo said he resigned "heartsick" because of the assassination of Aquino, whom he considered a "friend", and the resulting freefall of the Philippines' economy and international reputation.

According to Romulo's wife, Beth Day Romulo, the Marcos administration had asked him to sign an advertisement that the administration was planning to place in the New York Times and other major international dailies. Romulo refused to sign the advertisement and instead resigned.

Death
Romulo died, aged 87, in Manila on December 15, 1985, and was buried in the Heroes' Cemetery (Libingan ng mga Bayani) at Fort Bonifacio, Metro Manila. He was honored as "one of the truly great statesmen of the 20th century". In 1980, he was extolled by UN Secretary-General Kurt Waldheim as "Mr. United Nations" for his valuable services to the UN and his dedication to freedom and world peace.

Published books
Romulo, in all, wrote and published 22 books, including The United (novel), I Walked with Heroes (autobiography), I Saw the Fall of the Philippines, Mother America, and I See the Philippines Rise (war-time memoirs). In 1982, he was proclaimed a National Artist for Literature of the Philippines, in recognition of his contributions to Philippine Literature.

Honors
National Honors
: Quezon Service Cross – (April 17, 1951)
 Grand Collar of the Order of Sikatuna, Rank of Raja – (1982). 
: Philippine Legion of Honor, Commander (Komandante)
: National Artist of the Philippines
: Grand Cross (Dakilang Kamanong) of the Gawad Mabini  – (2005)
: Grand Cross (Maringal na Krus) of the Order of the Golden Heart – (1954)
: Member (Kagawad) of the Order of the Golden Heart – (13 September 1954)
: Presidential Medal of Merit  – (July 3, 1949)
 : Order of the Knights of Rizal, Knight Grand Cross of Rizal. – (1961)
 Bayani ng Bagong Republika (Hero of the New Republic Award)  – (14 January 1984)

Military Medals (Philippines)
: Distinguished Service Star 
: Philippine Gold Cross
: Philippine Defense Medal
: Philippine Liberation Medal

Military Medals (Foreign)
: Commander, Legion of Merit 
: Silver Star 
: Purple Heart 
: Asiatic–Pacific Campaign Medal

Foreign Honors
: Grand Cross, Order of Carlos Manuel do Cespedes
:: Grand Cross, Order of the Phoenix
:: Grand Cross, Military Order of Christ 
:: Knight Grand Cross (Caballeros Gran Cruz), Order of Isabella the Catholic
:: Presidential Medal of Freedom
:: Grand Cordon, Order of Brilliant Star

Awards and recognitions

Romulo is perhaps among the most decorated Filipinos in history. He has been awarded 72 honorary degrees from different international institutions and universities and 144 awards and decorations from foreign countries:

Nobel Peace Prize nomination in 1952 "For his contribution in international cooperation, in particular on questions on undeveloped areas, and as president for UN's 4th General Assembly"
Boy Scouts of America Silver Buffalo Award
Presidential Unit Citation with Two Oak Leaf Clusters
Pulitzer Prize in Correspondence, 1942
World Government News First Annual Gold Nadal Award (for work in the United Nations for peace and world government), March 1947
Princeton University – Woodrow Wilson Memorial Foundation Gold Medal award ("in recognition of his contribution to public life"), May 1947
International Benjamin Franklin Society's Gold Medal (for "distinguished world statesmanship in 1947"), January 1948
Freeman of the City of Plymouth, England, October 1948
United Nations Peace Medal
World Peace Award
Four Freedoms Peace Award
Notre Dame University, Doctor of Laws (LL.D.), 1935
Georgetown University, Doctor of Laws (LL.D.), 1960
Harvard University, Doctor of Laws (LL.D.), 1950

Anecdotes from Beth Romulo through Reader's Digest (June 1989)
At the third UN General Assembly, held in Paris in 1948, the USSR's deputy foreign minister, Andrei Vishinsky, sneered at Romulo and challenged his credentials: "You are just a little man from a little country." "It is the duty of the little Davids of this world," cried Romulo, "to fling the pebbles of truth in the eyes of the blustering Goliaths and force them to behave!"

During his meeting with Josip Broz Tito of Yugoslavia, Marshal Tito welcomed Gen. Romulo with drinks and cigars, to which the general kindly refused. Their conversation went as follows:

At this, Marshal Tito was tickled by his reply and loudly exclaimed around the room, "I etcetera, etcetera, etcetera!"

Romulo was a dapper little man (barely five feet four inches in shoes). When they waded in at Leyte beach in October 1944, and the word went out that General MacArthur was waist deep, one of Romulo's journalist friends cabled, "If MacArthur was in water waist deep, Romulo must have drowned!"

In later years, Romulo told another story himself about a meeting with MacArthur and other tall American generals who disparaged his physical stature. "Gentlemen," he declared, "When you say something like that, you make me feel like a dime among nickels."

Books

I Saw the Fall of the Philippines.
My Brother Americans
I See The Philippines Rise
I am a Filipino
The United
Crusade in Asia (The John Day Company, 1955; about the 1953 presidential election campaign of Ramón Magsaysay)
The Meaning of Bandung
The Magsaysay Story (with Marvin M. Gray, The John Day Company 1956, updated re-edition by Pocket Books, Special Student Edition, SP-18, December 1957; biography of Ramón Magsaysay, Pocket Books edition updated with an additional chapter on Magsaysay's death)
I Walked with Heroes (autobiography)
Last Man off Bataan (Romulo's experience during the Japanese Plane bombings.)
Romulo: A Third World Soldier at the UN
Daughters for Sale and Other Plays

See also

List of Filipino Nobel laureates and nominees
List of Asian Americans and Pacific Islands Americans in the United States Congress
Resident Commissioner of the Philippines
The Thomasites
Philinda Rand

Citations

References

External links

 Extensive biography

 
 
 

1898 births
1985 deaths
Ambassadors of the Philippines to the United States
Benjamin Franklin Medal (Franklin Institute) laureates
Burials at the Libingan ng mga Bayani
Columbia University alumni
Filipino diplomats
Filipino writers
Grand Crosses of the Order of the Phoenix (Greece)
Ilocano people
Macapagal administration cabinet members
Ferdinand Marcos administration cabinet members
Members of the House of Representatives of the Philippines from Metro Manila
Members of the United States Congress of Filipino descent
National Artists of the Philippines
People from Pangasinan
People from Tarlac
Permanent Representatives of the Philippines to the United Nations
Philippine Army generals of World War II
Philippine Army generals
Presidential Medal of Freedom recipients
Presidents of the United Nations General Assembly
Presidents of universities and colleges in the Philippines
Pulitzer Prize for Correspondence winners
Quirino administration cabinet members
Recipients of Gawad Mabini
Recipients of the Distinguished Conduct Star
Recipients of the Distinguished Service Star
Recipients of the Gold Cross (Philippines)
Recipients of the Philippine Legion of Honor
Recipients of the Philippine Republic Presidential Unit Citation
Recipients of the Quezon Service Cross
Resident Commissioners of the Philippines
Recipients of the Presidential Medal of Merit (Philippines)
Scouting in the Philippines
Secretaries of Education of the Philippines
Secretaries of Foreign Affairs of the Philippines
University of the Philippines Manila alumni
Members of the Batasang Pambansa
The Philippines Herald
Filipino journalists
Liberal Party (Philippines) politicians
Nacionalista Party politicians